El Barrero is a corregimiento in Pesé District, Herrera Province, Panama with a population of 1,841 as of 2010. Its population as of 1990 was 1,535; its population as of 2000 was 1,774.

References

Corregimientos of Herrera Province